Arassen Ragaven (born 8 April 1987) is a former professional footballer who played as a midfielder. Born in France, he represented Mauritius internationally, earning a total of 14 caps for the national team.

References

1987 births
Living people
French people of Mauritian descent
Mauritian footballers
French footballers
Footballers from Paris
Association football midfielders
AJ Auxerre players
FC Lorient players
US Sénart-Moissy players
FC Melun players
RCP Fontainebleau players

External links 

 
 

Championnat National 3 players
Championnat National 2 players
Mauritius international footballers